Josh Hurlbert is an American politician in the Missouri House of Representatives, elected in November 2020 to represent District 12, and is a member of the Republican Party (United States). After redistricting in 2022, his home was placed in District 8, and so he ran for reelection there and won.

Missouri House of Representatives

Committee assignments 
 General Laws
 Transportation
 Workforce Development
 Joint Committee on Transportation Oversight

Source:

Electoral history

References 

Republican Party members of the Missouri House of Representatives
Living people
Year of birth missing (living people)